Barry B. Telford (born October 24, 1946) is an American politician who served in the Texas House of Representatives from 1987 to 2005. He was the Bowie County Democratic Chair from 1980 to 1986.

Life
Telford was born on October 24, 1946, in New Boston, Texas. He attended Texarkana Junior College and graduated from North Texas State University in 1970 with a Bachelor of Science degree in education.

House of Representatives election results (1986-2002)

References

1946 births
Democratic Party members of the Texas House of Representatives
Living people
20th-century American politicians